Robert Maurice Harris (September 27, 1943 – August 11, 2001) was an American jazz pianist, keyboardist and arranger.

Career
Born in September 1943 in Los Angeles, California, he was the son of Maurice Harris, a trumpet player in The Tonight Show Band led by Doc Severinsen. He worked as a jazz pianist in clubs in the Los Angeles area. In 1966 he married singer-songwriter Judee Sill. Harris wrote orchestral arrangements with Don Bagley for Sill's debut album in 1971. He also played as a pianist for The Turtles. Harris later wrote arrangements for recordings by The Friends of Distinction and Jack Jones.

Harris joined jazz guitarist Gábor Szabó in 1970 and was a member of Frank Zappa's band The Mothers for a short time in 1971. He appeared on the Zappa album Fillmore East – June 1971. Recordings from the same concerts also appeared on The John Lennon / Yoko Ono album Sometime in New York City. He also appeared on the Zappa album Playground Psychotics where he was a soloist on the Wurlitzer Electric Piano on the song Billy the Mountain.

At the end of the 1970s Harris toured with Ray Charles. He died in 2001 from the effects of a drug overdose.

This Bob Harris should not be confused with the unrelated keyboard player, trumpeter and singer Bob Harris who worked with Frank Zappa in 1980.

Discography
Friends of Distinction: Whatever 1970
Judee Sill: Judee Sill 1971

With Frank Zappa and the Mothers of Invention
Fillmore East - June 1971 (1971)
You Can't Do That on Stage Anymore, Vol. 6 (1992)
Playground Psychotics (1992)
Finer Moments (2012)
 Mudshark Live (2015)

With Plastic Ono Band
Some Time in New York City (1972)

1943 births
2001 deaths
American pianists
The Mothers of Invention members
American male pianists
20th-century American male musicians